Luis Díaz Carballido (born 27 February 1995) is a Spanish footballer who plays for UD Somozas as a central midfielder.

Club career
Born in Lugo, Galicia, Díaz was a SCD Milagrosa youth graduate, joining their youth setup in 2004. He made his senior debut in the 2010–11 season, in the regional leagues.

In 2016, Díaz moved to CD Lugo, being initially assigned to the farm team also in the lower levels. He made his first team debut on 5 September of the following year, coming on as a substitute for fellow youth graduate Pedro López in a 1–1 Copa del Rey away draw against Gimnàstic de Tarragona (3–1 win on penalties).

Díaz left Polvorín in 2020 and moved to SD Sarriana in the regional leagues. In July 2021, he agreed to a contract with Tercera División RFEF side UD Somozas.

References

External links

1995 births
Living people
Footballers from Lugo
Spanish footballers
Association football midfielders
Tercera División players
Tercera Federación players
Divisiones Regionales de Fútbol players
Polvorín FC players
CD Lugo players
UD Somozas players